The Brunei Darussalam Red Crescent Society was established in 1997. It has its headquarters in Bandar Seri Begawan

External links
IFRC profile page
Official Red Cross Web Site 

Red Cross and Red Crescent national societies
Organizations established in 1997
1997 establishments in Brunei
Medical and health organisations based in Brunei